The Sarah Eliza Harris House, located at 375 E. 200 North in Beaver, Utah, is a historic house built up around an original adobe cabin from c.1865. The main part was built c.1874;  an east addition with an unusual bay window was built c.1895 (probably built by mason Louis W. Harris who owned it during 1884–1897, and probably incorporating brick underneath stucco).

It was listed on the National Register of Historic Places in 1983.

References 

Houses on the National Register of Historic Places in Utah
Houses completed in 1856
Houses in Beaver County, Utah
National Register of Historic Places in Beaver County, Utah